Anton Khromykh (born 23 May 1982) is a professional Ukrainian former football midfielder.

External links

1982 births
Living people
Footballers from Luhansk
Ukrainian footballers
Ukrainian expatriate footballers
Expatriate footballers in Belarus
Association football midfielders
FC Arsenal Kharkiv players
FC Dnepr Mogilev players
FC Chornomorets Odesa players
MFC Mykolaiv players
FC Dnister Ovidiopol players
FC Helios Kharkiv players
FC Stal Alchevsk players
FC Naftan Novopolotsk players
FC Real Pharma Odesa players
FC Zhemchuzhyna Odesa players